Catephia dentifera is a species of moth of the family Erebidae first described by Frederic Moore in 1882. It is found in India, Nepal and Vietnam.

References

External links

Catephia
Moths of Asia
Moths described in 1882